Listed below are the dates and results for the 1994 FIFA World Cup qualification rounds for the North, Central American and Caribbean zone (CONCACAF).

A total of 24 CONCACAF teams entered the competition. The North, Central American and Caribbean zone was allocated 2.25 places (out of 24) in the final tournament. The United States, as hosts, qualified automatically, leaving 1.25 spot open for competition between 22 teams, because Cuba (Caribbean group) withdrew before playing.

There would be three rounds of play. Mexico and Canada received byes and advanced to the second round directly. The remaining 20 teams were divided into two zones, based on geographical considerations.

Format
Caribbean Zone: The 14 teams played in knockout matches on a home-and-away basis to determine three winners advancing to the second round.
Central American Zone: The six teams were paired up to play knockout matches on a home-and-away basis. The winners would advance to the second round.
In the second round, the eight teams were divided into two groups of four teams each. They played against each other on a home-and-away basis. The group winners and runners-up would advance to the final round.

In the final round, the four teams played against each other on a home-and-away basis. The group winner would qualify. The runner-up would advance to the CONCACAF–OFC intercontinental play-off.

Caribbean Zone

First preliminary round
   

|}

Puerto Rico advanced to the second preliminary round, 3–2 on aggregate.

Saint Vincent and the Grenadines advanced to the second preliminary round, 3–2 on aggregate.

Second preliminary round
   

|}

2–2 on aggregate. Bermuda advanced to the first round on away goals.

Jamaica advanced to the first round, 3–1 on aggregate.

Antigua and Barbuda advanced to the first round, 4–1 on aggregate.

Suriname advanced to the first round, 3–2 on aggregate.

Trinidad and Tobago advanced to the first round, 5–1 on aggregate.

Cuba withdrew, so Saint Vincent and the Grenadines advanced to the first round automatically.

First round
   
 
   

|}

Bermuda advanced to the second round, 5–1 on aggregate.

Jamaica advanced to the second round, 3–2 on aggregate.

Saint Vincent and the Grenadines advanced to the second round, 2–1 on aggregate.

Central American Zone

First round
   

|}

Honduras advanced to the second round, 2–0 on aggregate.

El Salvador advanced to the second round, 10–1 on aggregate.

Costa Rica advanced to the second round, 5–2 on aggregate.

Second round

Group A

Mexico and Honduras advanced to the final round.

Group B

El Salvador and Canada advanced to the final round.

Final round

Mexico qualified. Canada advanced to the CONCACAF–OFC play-off.

Inter-confederation play-offs

Qualified teams
The following two teams from CONCACAF qualified for the final tournament.

1 Bold indicates champions for that year. Italic indicates hosts for that year.

Goalscorers

7 goals

 Shaun Goater
 Francisco Uribe

6 goals

 Alex Bunbury
 Mágico González
 Óscar Ulloa

5 goals

 Juan Flores Madariaga
 César Obando

4 goals

 John Catliff
 Javier Astua
 Carlos Castro Borja
 Hector Wright
 Luis García Postigo
 Carlos Hermosillo

3 goals

 Derrick Edwards
 Dale Mitchell
 Domenic Mobilio
 Milton Meléndez
 Eduardo Bennett
 Richardson Smith
 Nicolás Suazo
 Paul Davis
 Marcelino Bernal
 Luis Flores
 Alberto Garcia Aspe
 Ramón Ramírez

2 goals

 Kentoine Jennings
 Colin Miller
 Juan Carlos Arguedas
 Luis Diego Arnáez
 Austin Berry
 Óscar Ramírez
 Richard Smith
 Dinardo Rodríguez
 Mauricio Cienfuegos
 Raúl Díaz Arce
 Guillermo Rivera
 Charlie Eliezar
 Ignacio Ambríz
 Hugo Sanchez
 Claudio Suárez
 José Manuel de la Torre
 Zague
 Víctor René Mendieta Ocampo
 Earl Jean
 Curtis Joseph
 Hutson Charles

1 goal

 Quentin Clarke
 Luke Ivor
 Tyrone White
 Paul Cann
 Kyle Lightbourne
 Neil Paynter
 Sammy Swan
 Kenneth Thompson
 Geoff Aunger
 Lyndon Hooper
 Mark Watson
 Rónald González Brenes
 Hernán Medford
 Miguel Estrada
 William Renderos Iraheta
 Julio Palacios Lozano
 Kevin Archer
 Antonhy Stanton
 Marco Antonio Anariba
 Eugenio Dolmo Flores
 Alex Pineda Chacón
 Antonio Zelaya
 Winston Anglin
 Ricardo Hyde
 Peter Isaacs
 Roderick Reid
 Linnal Wilson
 Francisco Javier Cruz
 Giovanni Regales
 César Rostrán
 Ramiro Borja
 Andre Espinoza
 Marcos Lugris
 Franco Paonessa
 Alphonsus Brown
 Francis Dupont
 Rodney Jack
 Joseph Francis
 Eric Godlieb
 Marciano Leyman
 Stanley Samson
 Brian Haynes
 Marvin Faustin
 Kerry Jamerson
 Russell Latapy
 Leonson Lewis

1 own goal

 Nick Dasovic (playing against Australia)
 Dangelo Bautista (playing against Canada)
 Richardson Smith (playing against Mexico)

External links
 1994 FIFA World Cup qualification (CONCACAF) at FIFA.com

 
CONCACAF
FIFA World Cup qualification (CONCACAF)
Qual
Qual
Qual